"If Only I Could" is a song by American-German singer-songwriter Sydney Youngblood, released in 1989 as the lead single from his debut album, Feeling Free (1989). The song was co-written by Youngblood with Mike Staab, Ralf Hamm, and Claus Zundel, a producer of multi-million-selling projects like Sacred Spirit and B-Tribe. It was released on vinyl, audio cassette and compact disc, and is now considered Youngblood's signature song, being his biggest hit and remaining popular with many of his fans. The song reached number one in Belgium and was a top 3 hit in many countries, including the UK, where it was the 11th-best-selling single of 1989. In the song, Youngblood evokes "the world of brotherhood and love that he would like to create 'if only [he] could'". This utopian humanism is "very uncommon in the songs devoted to nightclubs". "If Only I Could" uses the bassline and drumbeat from the Raze house track "Break 4 Love".

Chart performance
"If Only I Could" was very successful on the charts in Europe, becoming the singer's biggest hit to date. It peaked at number-one in Belgium, and entered the top 10 also in Austria (3), France (8), West Germany (3), Ireland (2), Sweden (9), Switzerland (3) and the United Kingdom, as well as on the Eurochart Hot 100, where it peaked at number four. In the UK, the single hit number three at the UK Singles Chart on October 1, 1989. It spent two weeks at that position and was the 13th best-selling single of 1989. Additionally, it was a top 20 hit in both Denmark (14) and Finland (17). Outside Europe, "If Only I Could" reached number 28 in New Zealand and number 122 in Australia. 

It earned a gold record in both Austria and West Germany, with a sale of 15,000 and 250,000 singles, and a silver record in the UK, after 200,000
units were sold there.

Critical reception
Retrospectively, AllMusic editor Jose F. Promis viewed the song as "pure, early-'90s house". Upon the release, Larry Flick from Billboard noted that the "rich-voiced crooner temporarily moves away from usual R&B arena and pumps up the bass for this tasty, deep-baked houser that splashes with a nifty Motown-flavored undercurrent and funky wah-wah guitars. The right edit could set urban and pop radio ablaze." A reviewer from Liverpool Echo named it "one of the nicest dance/pop records of recent months, bringing songs back into dance music. And - Sydney knows a good song when he hears one." Pan-European magazine Music & Media wrote, "Finally, Youngblood has found a song good enough to take his smooth, sweet voice to the higher reaches of the charts. The song combines a variety of styles - reggae meets hip-house with a dash of lover's rock. A sympathetic production by Claus Zundell and some supremely tasteful Spanish guitar breaks make this record a melodic delight. Starting to move rapidly up the UK chart and looking likely to repeat that success across Europe." David Giles from Music Week noted the song's "lush, sonorous vocal driven by a pulsating bass line", and concluded that "Youngblood looks set to become a big name on the strength of this single." Jacqui Carter from Number One stated, "'If Only I Could' will be one of the 'classic cuts' this year and continually played for many years to come." Orla Swift from Record-Journal described the song as "jazzy".

Music video
A music video was produced to promote the single. It features Youngblood bouncing around a ball that resembled the earth, while donning urban clothing and traditional African clothing.

Track listings

 7" single
 "If Only I Could" — 3:30
 "Spooky" — 3:54

 12" single
 "If Only I Could" (Extended Version) — 6:30
 "If Only I Could" (Pacha Garden Mix) — 6:35
 "If Only I Could" (Instrumental) — 5:10
			
 3" CD single
 "If Only I Could" (Radio Edit) — 3:30
 "If Only I Could" (Extended Version) — 6:30
 "Spooky" — 3:54

 Cassette single
 "If Only I Could" — 3:30
 "Spookey" (Instrumental) — 3:54
 "If Only I Could" — 3:30
 "Spookey" (Instrumental) — 3:54

Charts

Weekly charts

Year-end charts

Certifications

Wendy Matthews' version

Australian recording artist Wendy Matthews released a version of the song in April 1993 as the third single from her second studio album, Lily. The song peaked at number 41 on the ARIA Charts.

Track listing
 "If Only I Could" (Edit) - 3:55
 "If Only I Could" (Timebomb Mix) - 5:45
 "Until You Say" - 4:48

Charts

References

1989 singles
1993 singles
1989 songs
English-language German songs
Number-one singles in Belgium
Songs written by Claus Zundel
Sydney Youngblood songs
Virgin Records singles
Wendy Matthews songs